Franz Perner is an Austrian Paralympic athlete. He competed in alpine skiing at the 1976 Winter Paralympics and in cross-country skiing at the 1980 Winter Paralympics, at the 1984 Winter Paralympics and at the 1988 Winter Paralympics. He also competed at one event in biathlon at the 1988 Winter Paralympics.

Achievements

See also 
 List of Paralympic medalists in alpine skiing

References

External links 
 

Living people
Year of birth missing (living people)
Place of birth missing (living people)
Paralympic alpine skiers of Austria
Paralympic cross-country skiers of Austria
Alpine skiers at the 1976 Winter Paralympics
Cross-country skiers at the 1980 Winter Paralympics
Cross-country skiers at the 1984 Winter Paralympics
Cross-country skiers at the 1988 Winter Paralympics
Biathletes at the 1988 Winter Paralympics
Paralympic silver medalists for Austria
Paralympic bronze medalists for Austria
Paralympic medalists in alpine skiing
Paralympic medalists in cross-country skiing
Medalists at the 1976 Winter Paralympics
Medalists at the 1980 Winter Paralympics